Saif bin Futtais Al-Mansoori (born September 2, 1973) is an Emirati sport shooter. He placed 29th in the men's skeet event at the 2016 Summer Olympics.

References

External links

1973 births
Living people
Sportspeople from Dubai
Skeet shooters
Emirati male sport shooters
Olympic shooters of the United Arab Emirates
Shooters at the 2016 Summer Olympics
Shooters at the 2002 Asian Games
Shooters at the 2006 Asian Games
Shooters at the 2010 Asian Games
Shooters at the 2014 Asian Games
Shooters at the 2018 Asian Games
Asian Games bronze medalists for the United Arab Emirates
Asian Games medalists in shooting
Medalists at the 2018 Asian Games
Shooters at the 2020 Summer Olympics